Aww Main Ma Main Ma is a 1972 Burmese black-and-white drama film, directed by Thukha starring Nyunt Win, Cho Pyone, Kyauk Lone, Thein Maung and Jolly Swe.

Cast
Nyunt Win as Dr. Kyaw Zay Ya
Cho Pyone as Baby
Kyauk Lone as Ba Hla Nyunt
Thein Maung as U Thein Zan
Jolly Swe as Paw Lar
San Ma Tu as U Kone Than

References

1972 films
1970s Burmese-language films
Films shot in Myanmar
Burmese black-and-white films
1972 drama films
Burmese drama films